Robert Walters may refer to:

Robert Walters Group, a global recruitment services group 
Robert Walters (footballer) (born 1955), Australian footballer
Robert Walters (mayor) (died 1733), mayor of New York City
Robert L. Walters, List of Scripps National Spelling Bee champions
Bob Walters
Rob Walters, director of Spend an Evening with Saddle Creek

See also
Robert Walter (disambiguation)